Melli Assembly constituency is one of the 32 assembly constituencies of Sikkim a north east state of India. Melli is part of Sikkim Lok Sabha constituency.

Members of Legislative Assembly
 1979: Mohan Prasad Sharma, Sikkim Janata Parishad
 1985: Dilli Ram Basnet, Sikkim Sangram Parishad
 1989: Dilli Ram Basnet, Sikkim Sangram Parishad
 1994: Girish Chandra Rai, Sikkim Democratic Front
 1999: Girish Chandra Rai, Sikkim Democratic Front
 2004: Girish Chandra Rai, Sikkim Democratic Front
 2009: Tulshi Devi Rai, Sikkim Democratic Front
 2014: Tulshi Devi Rai, Sikkim Democratic Front

Election results

2019

See also

 Melli
 South Sikkim district
 List of constituencies of Sikkim Legislative Assembly

References

Assembly constituencies of Sikkim
Namchi district